Hibbertia montana is a species of flowering plant in the family Dilleniaceae and is endemic to the south-west of Western Australia. It is an erect, straggling or sprawling shrub with densely hairy foliage, narrow oblong leaves, and pedunculate yellow flowers with thirty to sixty stamens and a few staminodes arranged around velvety carpels.

Description
There are thirty to sixty stamens and a few staminodes arranged around the four or five velvety-hairy carpels. Flowering occurs from July to October.

Taxonomy
Hibbertia montana was first formally described in 1845 by Ernst Gottlieb von Steudel in 1845 in Johann Georg Christian Lehmann's  Plantae Preissianae from specimens collected near York in 1839. The specific epithet (montana) means "pertaining to mountains".

Distribution and habitat
This hibbertia grows near granite rocks and on hills on the Darling Range in the Avon Wheatbelt and Jarrah Forest biogeographic regions of south-western Western Australia.

Conservation status
Hibbertia montana is classified as "not threatened" by the Western Australian Government Department of Parks and Wildlife.

See also
List of Hibbertia species

References

montana
Eudicots of Western Australia
Plants described in 1845
Taxa named by Ernst Gottlieb von Steudel